Budslau is a village in Belarus. It is located in the Myadzyel District of Minsk Region, 150 km north of the capital Minsk.

The village developed itself around the Minor Basilica of the Assumption of the Blessed Virgin Mary consecrated in 1643. The church is known for the icon of Our Lady of Budslau. The annual celebration in honor of the icon which takes place on July 2 was added to the UNESCO Intangible Cultural Heritage List in 2018.

Notable residents 
 
Vincent Žuk-Hryškievič (1903-1989), Belarusian emigre politician, President of the Rada of the Belarusian Democratic Republic

References

External links 
 The National Sanctuary of the Mother of God in Budslau

Villages in Belarus
Populated places in Minsk Region
Myadzyel District
Vilnius Voivodeship
Vileysky Uyezd
Wilno Voivodeship (1926–1939)